Leptospermum anfractum is a species of spreading shrub that is endemic to Queensland. It has a smooth, twisted trunk, linear leaves, white flowers borne in leaf axils and bell-shaped to hemispherical fruit. It grows on rocky ridges and cliff edges.

Description
The bark is white when new but ages to purplish. The lower side of the leaves is hairy. The flowers are borne singly or in groups of up to six in leaf axils, each with bracts and bracteoles that fall off before the flower opens. The petals are white.

Taxonomy and naming
Leptospermum anfractum was first formally described in 2004 by Anthony Bean who published the description in the journal Telopea. The specific epithet (anfractum) is from the Latin anfractus meaning "bending, winding or crooked" referring to the stems and branches.

Distribution and habitat
This leptospermum grows on rocky ridges and cliff lines between Cardwell and Proserpine with a disjunct population near Laura.

Conservation status
This species is classified as of "least concern" under the Queensland Government Nature Conservation Act 1992.

References

anfractum
Myrtales of Australia
Flora of Queensland
Plants described in 2004